Muntazir Mehdi (born 15 December 1981) is a Pakistani cricketer. He played in 14 first-class and 20 List A matches between 2001 and 2014. He made his Twenty20 debut on 26 April 2005, for Lahore Lions in the 2004–05 National Twenty20 Cup.

References

External links
 

1981 births
Living people
Pakistani cricketers
Lahore cricketers
Lahore Lions cricketers
Lahore Whites cricketers
Place of birth missing (living people)